Listen Lena is a 1927 American comedy film directed by Clem Beauchamp.  According to the Internet Movie Database, Fatty Arbuckle appears in this film as a "fat man with strategically covered face", although the role is uncredited and unconfirmed.

Cast
 Al St. John as Al Adams
 Lucille Hutton as Lena
 Jack Lloyd
 Clem Beauchamp as Cyril
 Glen Cavender
 Al Thompson
 Roscoe 'Fatty' Arbuckle as Fat man with strategically covered face (uncredited) (unconfirmed)

See also
 Fatty Arbuckle filmography

External links

1927 films
1927 comedy films
1927 short films
American silent short films
Educational Pictures short films
American black-and-white films
Films directed by Stephen Roberts
Silent American comedy films
American comedy short films
1920s American films